The California Privacy Protection Agency (CPPA) is a California state government agency created by the California Privacy Rights Act of 2020 (CPRA). As the first dedicated privacy regulator in the United States, the agency implements and enforces the CPRA and the California Consumer Privacy Act.

References 

Privacy law
Data protection
Information privacy
State agencies of California
Data protection authorities